This is a list of South Korean banks. The parenthesized number is the bank number.

Central bank
Bank of Korea (001)

Government-run banks
Korea Development Bank (002)
Industrial Bank of Korea (003)
Korea Eximbank (008)
The following banks are not owned by the Korean government, but their organizations (NFAC-which is a sole shareholder of Nonghyup financial group and NFFC) are largely influenced by the Korean government. 
National Federation of Fisheries Cooperatives
 Suhyup Bank (007)
Nonghyup Financial Group
Nonghyup Bank (011)

Nationwide banks
Citigroup
Citibank Korea (027)
Hana Financial Group
KEB Hana Bank (081)
KB Financial Group
KB Kookmin Bank (004)
Standard Chartered
Standard Chartered Korea (023) (trading as SC First)
Shinhan Financial Group
Shinhan Bank (088)
Woori Financial Group
Woori Bank (020)

Local banks
DGB Financial Group (Daegu Bank) (031)
BNK Financial Group
Busan Bank (032)
Kyongnam Bank (039)
 
Kwangju Bank (034)
Jeonbuk Bank (037)
Shinhan Financial Group
  (035)

Internet banks
K Bank (089)
KakaoBank (090)
TossBank (092)

Foreign banks
GIRO code for unlisted foreign banks is 051. 
Agricultural Bank of China
Australia and New Zealand Banking Group Limited
Bank Mellat 
Bank of America (060)
Bank of China (063)
Bank of Communications (066)
Bank Negara Indonesia
China Construction Bank
Industrial and Commercial Bank of China (062)
OCBC Bank
United Overseas Bank (065)
Wells Fargo
The Bank of Tokyo-Mitsubishi UFJ (059)
Deutsche Bank (055)
JPMorgan Chase (057)
Mizuho Corporate Bank (058)
State Bank of India
National Bank of Pakistan
Metropolitan Bank and Trust Co., Ltd (Korea)

Representative banks
Indian Overseas Bank

Other banking organizations
Strictly, these institutions are not banks, but have a similar purpose and are widely recognised as a kind of bank. These institutions cannot use the name "bank", except (according to the 2010 Mutual Savings Banks Act) the Mutual Savings Bank.
Credit Union (048)
Korea Federation of Community Credit Cooperatives (045, 046, 085)
National Forestry Cooperative Federation (064)
Nonghyup Local Cooperatives (012)
Mutual Savings Bank (050)
Korea Post (071), Postal Financial Service by MSIP
Korea Credit Guarantee Fund
Suhyup Local Cooperatives (007)

M&A tree
KB Kookmin Bank
Kookmin Bank (old, ~2001)
Daedong Bank (~1998)
Long-term Credit Bank (~1998)
Housing and Commercial Bank (~2001)
Dongnam Bank (~1998)
Woori Bank
Woori Bank ← Hanvit Bank
The Commercial Bank of Korea
Hanil Bank
Korea Peace Bank (~2001)
Shinhan Bank
CHB Bank(Chohung Bank) (~2006)
Chungbuk Bank (~1999)
Kangwon Bank (~1999)
Shinhan Bank (old, ~2006)
Dongwha Bank (~1998)
KEB Hana Bank
Korea Exchange Bank (~2012)
Seoulbank (~2002)
Boram Bank (~1996)
Chungchong Bank (~1998)
Citibank Korea
Citibank N.A. Seoul branch (~2004)
KorAm Bank (~2004)
Kyungki Bank

See also

List of South Korean companies
Economy of South Korea

Korea, South
Banks
South Korea